Faces in the Fog is a 1944 American drama film directed by John English and starring Jane Withers, Paul Kelly and Lee Patrick.

Plot
Hard-partying Tom and Cora Elliott neglect their kids, 17-year-old Mary and 14-year-old Les. This worries their neighbor. Dr. Fred Mason.

At the urging of older boy Mike, Les sneaks a gun out of his dad's home and goes to a party at Dr. Mason's house, where Mary is flirting with 18-year-old Joe Mason. Mike accidentally shoots Les, who is only grazed. Another boy at the party tells the police about the incident. Tom believes Dr. Mason informed the cops, and is furious. He demands that Mary stop seeing Joe. Mary and Joe conspire to attend a school dance with other dates, but spend the night dancing. The two argue, and Mary leaves with Mike. The drunken Mike strikes a pedestrian with his car. Joe takes the injured man to the hospital, and is blamed for the accident.

Joe decides to enlist in the army. Realizing their fight was silly, Mary elopes with him. A jealous Mike sees them spending the night at a motel, and tells Mary's dad, Tom. Tom rushes to the motel and shoots Joe. Tom is acquitted for "defending his daughter's honor". Mary reveals that she and Joe are married. Mary and Joe are allowed to spend a week on a honeymoon before Mary faces a perjury trial for her various lies.

Partial cast
 Jane Withers as Mary Elliott  
 Paul Kelly as Tom Elliott  
 Lee Patrick as Cora Elliott  
 John Litel as Dr. Mason 
 Eric Sinclair as Joe Mason  
 Dorothy Peterson as Mrs. Mason  
 Gertrude Michael as Nora Brooks  
 H.B. Warner as Defense Attorney Rankins  
 Richard Byron as Mike  
 Roger Clark as Sgt. O'Donnell  
 Adele Mara as Gertrude  
 Bob Stebbins as Les Elliott 
 Charles Trowbridge as Mr. White  
 Helen Talbot as Alice 
 Joel McGinnis as Danny  
 Tom London as Auto Court Manager  
 Emmett Vogan as Capt. Roberts

See also
List of American films of 1944

References

Bibliography
 Clifford McCarty. Film Composers in America: A Filmography, 1911-1970. Oxford University Press, 2000.

External links
 

1944 films
American drama films
Films directed by John English
Republic Pictures films
Films with screenplays by Jack Townley
American black-and-white films
1944 drama films
1940s English-language films
1940s American films